This is a timeline of online money transfer and e-commerce service PayPal, owned by eBay from 2002 to 2015 and an independent company before and after that.

Big picture

Full timeline

References
Works cited
 

Notes

PayPal
PayPal
Payments